The Sterope  or Asterope  system is a double star in the zodiac constellation of Taurus. Its components have the Flamsteed designations 21 Tauri and 22 Tauri, and are sometimes known as Sterope I and Sterope II, respectively.

The International Astronomical Union applies the name Asterope specifically to 21 Tauri. 
The two stars are thus

 21 Tauri (or Sterope I, formally Asterope)
 22 Tauri (or Sterope II)

The two stars are separated by 0.047° on the sky, which is equal to 2.82 arc-minutes and thus closer than the usual naked-eye resolution limit of 4 arc-min, giving an elongated appearance of the two together. Both are members of the Pleiades open star cluster (M45) and approximately 440 light-years from the Sun.

Nomenclature
Asterope was one of the Pleiades sisters in Greek mythology.

In 2016, the International Astronomical Union organized a Working Group on Star Names (WGSN) to catalogue and standardize proper names for stars. The WGSN decided to attribute proper names to individual stars rather than entire multiple systems. It approved the name Asterope for 21 Tauri on 21 August 2016 and it is now so included in the List of IAU-approved Star Names.

Namesake
USS Sterope (AK-96) was a United States Navy Crater class cargo ship named after the star.

See also
 IC 1838
 Pleiades in folklore and literature
 Taurus (Chinese astronomy)

References

Taurus (constellation)
Pleiades Open Cluster
Sterope